This is a list of electoral results for the Electoral district of Swan Hill in Victorian state elections.

Members for Swan Hill

Election results

Elections in the 2010s

Elections in the 2000s

Elections in the 1990s

Elections in the 1980s 

 The two candidate preferred vote was not counted between the Liberal and National candidates for Swan Hill.

Elections in the 1970s 

 The two candidate preferred vote was not counted between the Liberal and National candidates for Swan Hill.

Elections in the 1960s

Elections in the 1950s

Elections in the 1940s

 Preferences were not distributed.

 Preferences were not distributed.

Elections in the 1930s

 Preferences were not distributed.

Elections in the 1920s

Two party preferred vote was estimated.

Elections in the 1910s

 Two candidate preferred vote was not counted.

References

 

Victoria (Australia) state electoral results by district